AADL may refer to:

 Ann Arbor District Library
 Architecture Analysis & Design Language